Duncan Village Day Hospital is a Provincial government funded day hospital situated Braelyn in East London, Eastern Cape in South Africa. Patients are attended to by doctors as well as registered nurse practitioners.

This day hospital offers primary health care services on an outpatient basis. They also have a small onsite anti-retroviral (ARV) and tuberculosis (TB) clinic. Basic gynaecology and family planning services are also available.

They do attend to minor emergency cases, but emergencies are referred to Frere Hospital. For non-urgent services, patients are referred to Empilweni Gompo, e.g. physiotherapy.

This day hospital's facilities include Pharmacy, Anti-Retroviral (ARV) treatment for HIV/AIDS, and X-ray Services.

Notes
 built in the 1950s

External links
 Duncan Village Day Hospital

East London, Eastern Cape
Hospitals in the Eastern Cape